Bob and Mike Bryan were the defending champions at the time of the finals, but lost in the third round to Eric Butorac and Raven Klaasen.
Łukasz Kubot and Robert Lindstedt won the title, defeating Butorac and Klaasen in the final, 6–3, 6–3.

Seeds

Draw

Finals

Top half

Section 1

Section 2

Bottom half

Section 3

Section 4

References

Draw
Main Draw

External links
 2014 Australian Open – Men's draws and results at the International Tennis Federation

Men's Doubles
Australian Open (tennis) by year – Men's doubles